Poluyanov (masculine) or Poluyanova (feminine) is a Russian last name shared by the following people:

  (1922—1945), Hero of the Soviet Union
 Natalia Poluyanova (born 1981), Russian politician
 Nikolay Poluyanov (born 1952), Russian politician
 Valeri Poluyanov (1943–2015), Soviet footballer